Bedellia silvicolella is a moth in the family Bedelliidae. It is endemic to the Canary Islands.

The larvae feed on Convolvulus canariensis and Convolvulus floridus. They mine the leaves of their host plant. The mine starts as a slender corridor with a thick, central frass line that sometimes occupies the entire width of the leaf. Later, larvae create larger, brownish, full-depth fleck mines, often in different leaves.

External links
bladmineerders.nl

Bedelliidae